35007 is also a zip code of Alabaster, Alabama.

35007 (Loose in beghilos) is a band from the Netherlands. The sound of 35007 has been described as stoner rock, psychedelic rock, space rock and progressive rock.

History 
35007 was formed in Eindhoven, Netherlands at the end of the eighties and originate from The Alabama Kids. 35007's early line-up consisted of Eeuwout Baart (vocals), Mark Sponselee (sounds, synths), Bertus Fridael (guitar), Jacco Van Rooy (drums), Michel Boekhoudt (bass guitar), Luk Sponselee (vj) and Pidah Kloos (sounds, soundengineer).

They released their debut album "Especially for You" in 1994. After the self-titled album "35007", Jacco van Rooy left the band and was replaced by Sander Evers on drums. In 2001, Eeuwout Baart also left the band and 35007 continued as an instrumental unit. "Sea of Tranquillity" is the first of three instrumental releases. In 2005 the band, now with Tos Nieuwenhuizen from Beaver on guitar, released "Phase V" but was never seen on stage again.

Their live shows were accompanied with visual effects, such as psychedelic videos projected on stage.

In the years after "Phase V" Bertus Fridael started his own band Mother-Unit, Sander Evers played in Gomer Pyle between 2006 and 2010, he is currently performing with the band Monomyth, Jacco van Rooy joined Motorpsycho for a short period of time and is now in the band Neon Twin, Tos Nieuwenhuizen performed live with Sunn O))), Mark and Luk Sponselee produced experimental music in Group Art Fou.

35007 performed several times at the annual international Roadburn Festival in the Netherlands, as well as the other groups in which the former members of 35007 play.

December 2012 saw a vinyl rerelease of "Phase V" on Burning World records.

On the December 30, 2012, Mark Sponselee died from the effects of pneumonia.

Bassist Michel Boekhoudt died on February 18, 2022.

Discography

Studio albums 
 Especially for You (1994)
 35007 (sometimes credited as 'Into the Void We Travelled') (1997)
 Liquid (2002)
 Phase V (2005)

Others 
 Sea of Tranquillity EP (2001)
 Phase V Vinyl Edition (2012)

External links 
 Official web site

Musical groups from Eindhoven
Space rock musical groups
Dutch stoner rock musical groups
Dutch post-rock groups